The Palacio del Gobernador is a government building located in Intramuros, Manila, Philippines. It is located southwest from Plaza de Roma and built in its current form in 1976. At present, the building houses the Intramuros Administration, the Commission on Elections and the Home Development Mutual Fund National Capital Region Office. It also previously housed the Bureau of the Treasury until it relocated across Plaza de Roma to the Ayuntamiento de Manila.

The site of the present building was where the former residence of the governor-general during the Spanish colonial era was located until an earthquake destroyed it on June 3, 1863. Governor Rafael de Echagüe y Bermingham moved to Malacañang after the earthquake. The Malacañang Palace then became the governor-general's official residence.

The building's exterior was used in the Chuck Norris film Delta Force 2: The Colombian Connection for a scene set in Rio de Janeiro during a Brazilian Carnaval parade.

References

Buildings and structures in Intramuros
Government buildings in the Philippines
Palaces in the Philippines